Desmiphora hirticollis is a species of beetle in the family Cerambycidae. It was described by Guillaume-Antoine Olivier in 1795. It has been found from the United States to South America, including the Galapagos Islands, Puerto Rico, Jamaica, and the Caribbean.

References

Desmiphora
Beetles described in 1795